Thomas Francis Rouen (born June 9, 1968) is a former American football punter who was the long-time punter for the Denver Broncos of the National Football League (NFL).

Early life
Rouen attended Heritage High School in Littleton, Colorado, where he lettered in football and baseball.  He was also listed on the depth chart as a tight end.

College career
Rouen started his career at Colorado State University in 1987 before transferring to the University of Colorado. He led the nation as a junior with a 45.9 yards per punt average, earning a spot on the All-America team. Rouen's most famous punt came in the final minute of the 1991 Orange Bowl when Raghib Ismail returned the punt 91 yards for a touchdown. The return was called back on a clipping penalty and Colorado won the game 10-9 and a share of the 1990 National Championship.

Professional career
Rouen was an undrafted free agent with the New York Giants in 1991 but was waived before the preseason. The following year, he signed with the Los Angeles Rams but again was waived before the preseason.

He signed with the Ohio Glory of the World League of American Football and made the All-World League team. He then joined the Denver Broncos before the start of the 1993 NFL season and played for the Broncos for eight seasons, in the process winning Super Bowl XXXII and Super Bowl XXXIII. He appeared in every game with the Broncos. 's NFL off-season, Tom Rouen held at least 3 Broncos franchise records, including:
career punts (641), punt yards (28,146), and punts in a playoff game (nine on December 31, 2000 against the Baltimore Ravens; with Britton Colquitt).

He then had a journeyman-like 2002 season—he was waived by the Broncos, was signed and subsequently waived by the New York Giants, and was picked up by the Pittsburgh Steelers all within the course of six weeks. He finished the season with Pittsburgh before signing with the Seattle Seahawks before the 2003 NFL season. He was placed on injured reserve midway through the 2004 campaign and was later waived by Seattle. He was signed by the Carolina Panthers before the 2005 season, but they released him in favor of Jason Baker, and he was re-signed by Seattle, where he completed the 2005 season before being released.

He was later signed by the 49ers to compete with Andy Lee for the starting punter job but later cut from the team and did not play in 2006.

Personal life
Rouen has been married to six-time Olympic gold medalist swimmer Amy Van Dyken since 2001. The couple splits their time between Arizona and Colorado.

References

1968 births
Living people
All-American college football players
American football punters
Carolina Panthers players
Colorado Buffaloes football players
Colorado State Rams football players
Denver Broncos players
New York Giants players
Ohio Glory players
People from Hinsdale, Illinois
Pittsburgh Steelers players
San Francisco 49ers players
Seattle Seahawks players